Bizkaia Boggarts is a quidditch team based in Bizkaia, Basque Country, Spain. It was founded on December 6, 2014. Yeray Espinosa Cuevas is the captain and the coach David López. The first match they played was in 2015 Catalan Quidditch Cup against Imperius Zaragoza, winning 210*-70.

They achieved the second position in the 2015 transpyrinee cup and Mangamore cup, losing both against Barcelona Eagles, and in the 2016 Spanish Quidditch Cup against Madrid Wolves.

They won the 2015-2016 Basque Quidditch League, the first ever Basque Quidditch League, where Gasteiz Gamusins were runners-up.

History 
The club was officially created on December 6, 2014, but the project was initiated by Yeray Espinosa in March that same year. After some months looking for people to join him, he met enough people to start training. The first to join the team where Nahia Otegui, Javier Fernández and Irene Velasco. One month later, Sergio Gutiérrez and Ander Carbón joined the team. This was the roster when they played their first game ever, where they won 210*-70 against Imperius Zaragoza.

After some months without any games, they played against the newly created Gasteiz Gamusins in the neighbour city of Vitoria-Gasteiz, winning again 40*-110. In that summer Nagore Marquina, Josema Molinos, Sergio Johan Serrato and Sandor-Aritz Augusto joined the team.

They played their first tournament on August 8, 2015, the Transpirynees Cup. Their roster for the tournament was of only six players, and Nil (Barcelona Eagles) and Miguel (Madrid Wolves) joined them to complete an 8-players roster. Even with that they defeated Toulouse Quidditch and Nightmare Grims to reach the final and lose by snitch catch, 80*-30, against Barcelona Eagles. They had their biggest victory there, winning 200*-0 against Toulouse. After this tournament and before next season started, Andoni Aranguren and Alexander Domínguez joined the team.

On September 12, 2015, the Basque Quidditch League started. They won the league without losing any game.

On February 6 and 7, 2016 the team achieved the runner-up position in the 2016 Spanish Quidditch Cup, with a roster of only 9 players. Heroic was the victory in semifinals, 80*-20 against Malaka Vikings, with a player in the hospital and another player injured. Due to those injuries and fatigue, they couldn't repeat in the final and they lost 140-70* against Madrid Wolves.

Katia Domínguez, Borja Martín, Michele Serrato, Alba Romero has joined the team since then. On July 13, 2016, they announced the deal to have Miguel Vázquez in their team, after the player left Madrid Wolves.

Honours

Official tournaments

Friendly tournaments

Bizkaia Boggarts in tournaments 

 1st in the 2015-2016 Basque Quidditch League.
 2nd in the Transpiriquove.
 2nd in the 2015 Mangamore Kopa.
 2nd in the 2015-2016 Spanish Quidditch Cup.

Roster

References

Quidditch teams
Sports clubs established in 2014
2014 establishments in the Basque Country (autonomous community)
Sports teams in the Basque Country (autonomous community)